Aukje de Vries  (born 21 October 1964 in Leeuwarden) is a Dutch politician. As of 10 January 2022, De Vries is State of Secretary for Finance in the fourth Rutte cabinet. As a member of the People's Party for Freedom and Democracy (Volkspartij voor Vrijheid en Democratie) she had been an MP since 8 November 2012. She was also member of the provincial parliament of Friesland from 11 March 2011 until November 2012. Previously she was a member of the municipal council of Leeuwarden from 2002 to 2011.

References 
  Parlement.com biography
 Aukje de Vries, official government profile

1964 births
Living people
Members of the House of Representatives (Netherlands)
Members of the Provincial Council of Friesland
Municipal councillors of Leeuwarden
People's Party for Freedom and Democracy politicians
21st-century Dutch politicians
21st-century Dutch women politicians
State Secretaries for Finance of the Netherlands